Rhinocoeta armata is a species of flower chafer beetle that lives in South Africa.

References

Cetoniinae
Beetles described in 1860